The German Bank Building, known also as Louisville Home Federal Building, is a historic building in Downtown Louisville, Kentucky, United States.  It is located on the corner of Fifth and Market streets. The two-story structure was built in 1914 in a Beaux-Arts style with a limestone facade.  In 1918, the name of the building was changed to Louisville National Bank.  This was during World War I when many institutions changed names to avoid association with Germany.

The building was listed on the National Register of Historic Places in 1984, for its architecture.

References

National Register of Historic Places in Louisville, Kentucky
Beaux-Arts architecture in Kentucky
Commercial buildings completed in 1914
Commercial buildings in Louisville, Kentucky
Bank buildings on the National Register of Historic Places in Kentucky
1914 establishments in Kentucky
Banks established in 1914
German-American culture in Louisville, Kentucky